The 2014 Commonwealth Games Marathon Course is the route around Glasgow city that will be used for both the women's and men's marathons in the 2014 Commonwealth Games.

The route
The route was revealed by the games' organising committee on Friday 7 February 2014. The races will each make two laps of the course, which starts and finishes at Glasgow Green in the very centre of the city, and will run for 26 miles and 385 yards (42.195 km). The route will pass many of Glasgow's best known landmarks, and provide free spectator access to watch the races.

See also
2012 Olympic Marathon Course

References

External links
 2014 Commonwealth Games Official Marathon Route Map

Marathon Course, 2014 Commonwealth Games
Marathons in Scotland
Marathons at the Commonwealth Games